Skilled Stadium may refer to:

Kardinia Park, sports stadium in Geelong, Australia, named Skilled Stadium between 2002 and 2011
Robina Stadium, sports stadium on the Gold Coast, Australia, named Skilled Park between 2008 and 2013